Jules Morin (1914 – September 22, 1988) was a politician in Ontario, Canada. He was a Progressive Conservative member of the Legislative Assembly of Ontario from 1955 to 1963 and from 1967 to 1971 who represented the riding of Ottawa East. He was also a city councillor in Ottawa, Ontario from 1944 to 1974.

Background
Morin was born in Ottawa in 1914. He first worked as a milkman and later opened a store.

Politics
Morin was elected to Ottawa City Council in 1944 and served until 1974. He also served as a director of the Central Canada Exhibition.

He died of cancer in 1988.

External links 

Tribute in the legislature, October 18, 1988

1914 births
1988 deaths
Franco-Ontarian people
Ottawa city councillors
Progressive Conservative Party of Ontario MPPs